Mary Bertha Rawlinson  (1 June 1910 – 25 January 1994) was a New Zealand singer, actor, drama producer, composer and music teacher. She was born in Geraldine, New Zealand, in 1910.

In the 1976 Queen's Birthday Honours, she was appointed a Member of the Order of the British Empire, for services to music and drama.

References

1910 births
1994 deaths
New Zealand music teachers
People from Geraldine, New Zealand
New Zealand Members of the Order of the British Empire
20th-century New Zealand  women  singers
Women music educators